In mathematics, a semiorthogonal decomposition is a way to divide a triangulated category into simpler pieces. One way to produce a semiorthogonal decomposition is from an exceptional collection, a special sequence of objects in a triangulated category. For an algebraic variety X, it has been fruitful to study semiorthogonal decompositions of the bounded derived category of coherent sheaves, .

Semiorthogonal decomposition
Alexei Bondal and Mikhail Kapranov (1989) defined a semiorthogonal decomposition of a triangulated category  to be a sequence  of strictly full triangulated subcategories such that:
That is, there are "no morphisms from right to left".
The notation  is used for a semiorthogonal decomposition.

Having a semiorthogonal decomposition implies that every object of  has a canonical "filtration" whose graded pieces are (successively) in the subcategories .

Moreover, this sequence is unique up to a unique isomorphism.

However, that property is too strong for most purposes. For example, for an (irreducible) smooth projective variety X over a field, the bounded derived category  of coherent sheaves never has a nontrivial orthogonal decomposition, whereas it may have a semiorthogonal decomposition, by the examples below. 

A semiorthogonal decomposition of a triangulated category may be considered as analogous to a finite filtration of an abelian group.

Using that observation, a semiorthogonal decomposition  implies a direct sum splitting of Grothendieck groups:

For example, when  is the bounded derived category of coherent sheaves on a smooth projective variety X,  can be identified with the Grothendieck group  of algebraic vector bundles on X. In this geometric situation, using that  comes from a dg-category, a semiorthogonal decomposition actually gives a splitting of all the algebraic K-groups of X:

for all i.

Admissible subcategory
One way to produce a semiorthogonal decomposition is from an admissible subcategory. By definition, a full triangulated subcategory  is left admissible if the inclusion functor  has a left adjoint functor, written . Likewise,  is right admissible if the inclusion has a right adjoint, written , and it is admissible if it is both left and right admissible.

A right admissible subcategory  determines a semiorthogonal decomposition
,
where

By results of Bondal and Michel Van den Bergh, this holds more generally for  any regular proper triangulated category that is idempotent-complete.

Moreover, for a regular proper idempotent-complete triangulated category , a full triangulated subcategory is admissible if and only if it is regular and idempotent-complete. These properties are intrinsic to the subcategory.

Exceptional collection
Let k be a field, and let  be a k-linear triangulated category. That helps to explain the name.)

The triangulated subcategory generated by an exceptional object E is equivalent to the derived category  of finite-dimensional k-vector spaces, the simplest triangulated category in this context. (For example, every object of that subcategory is isomorphic to a finite direct sum of shifts of E.)

Alexei Gorodentsev and Alexei Rudakov (1987) defined an exceptional collection to be a sequence of exceptional objects  such that  for all i < j and all integers t. (That is, there are "no morphisms from right to left".) In a proper triangulated category  over k, such as the bounded derived category of coherent sheaves on a smooth projective variety, every exceptional collection generates an admissible subcategory, and so it determines a semiorthogonal decomposition:

where , and  denotes the full triangulated subcategory generated by the object . An exceptional collection is called full if the subcategory  is zero.

In particular, if X is a smooth projective variety such that  has a full exceptional collection , then the Grothendieck group of algebraic vector bundles on X is the free abelian group on the classes of these objects:

A smooth complex projective variety X with a full exceptional collection must have trivial Hodge theory, in the sense that  for all ; moreover, the cycle class map  must be an isomorphism.

Examples
The original example of a full exceptional collection was discovered by Alexander Beilinson (1978): the derived category of projective space over a field has the full exceptional collection
,
where O(j) for integers j are the line bundles on projective space. Full exceptional collections have also been constructed on all smooth projective toric varieties, del Pezzo surfaces, many projective homogeneous varieties, and some other Fano varieties.

This applies to every Fano variety over a field of characteristic zero, for example. It also applies to some other varieties, such as Enriques surfaces and some surfaces of general type.

On the other hand, many naturally occurring triangulated categories are "indecomposable". In particular, for a smooth projective variety X whose canonical bundle  is basepoint-free, every semiorthogonal decomposition  is trivial in the sense that  or  must be zero. For example, this applies to every variety which is Calabi–Yau in the sense that its canonical bundle is trivial.

See also 
Derived noncommutative algebraic geometry

Notes

References
 
 
 
 
 
 

 
Algebraic geometry